Simon Köpf (born March 25, 1987) is a retired German footballer who played as a central defender and current manager of TSV Essingen.

Career
Köpf began his career with VfR Aalen, and made his debut in March 2007, when he replaced Dennis Hillebrand in a Regionalliga Süd match against Bayern Munich II. He made a further four appearances in the 2006–07 season, and eighteen the following year as Aalen qualified for the new 3. Liga. After failing to make a first-team appearance in the first half of the season, he signed for Stuttgarter Kickers in January 2009, for whom he made nine appearances but was unable to prevent the club being relegated (along with Aalen). He made 43 appearances over the next two seasons, but missed almost the entire 2011–12 season due to injury: he only made one appearance, as a substitute for Vincenzo Marchese in the last minute of the season, as Kickers celebrated the Regionalliga Süd title with a 2–0 win against Bayern Munich II. He was released by Kickers in July 2013 and signed for TSV Essingen.

Coaching career
Retiring at the end of 2018, Köpf was immediately hired as the assistant manager of TSV Essingen. On 10 March 2022 Köpf appointed as head coach on a temporary basis until the end of the season. However, he continued in the same position prior to the 2022-23 season.

References

External links

1987 births
Living people
German footballers
VfR Aalen players
Stuttgarter Kickers players
3. Liga players
1. FC Normannia Gmünd players
Association football central defenders
People from Schwäbisch Gmünd
Sportspeople from Stuttgart (region)
Footballers from Baden-Württemberg
German football managers